The World Rapid Chess Championship 2021 is the 2021 edition of the annual World Rapid Chess Championship held by FIDE to determine the world champion in chess played under rapid time controls. Since 2012, FIDE has held the World Rapid and Blitz Championships at a joint tournament. Originally planned to be held in Nur-Sultan, Kazakhstan, new coronavirus restrictions introduced by the Kazakh government prompted FIDE to change the location of the tournament to Warsaw, Poland.

The event took place at the Stadion Narodowy in Warsaw between 26 and 28 December 2021, using a Swiss-system with 13 rounds for the open tournament and 11 rounds for the women's tournament. Players eligible to participate in the open tournament must either be rated at least 2550 Elo in a FIDE rating list during 2021, or be a reigning national champion. Time controls for the tournament are 15+10, meaning each player initially starts with 15 minutes and gains 10 seconds increment with each move.

Participants 
176 players took part in the open tournament, and 103 in the women's tournament.

Prize fund 
The prize fund for both the open and women's tournament is shown below. In case of a tie (except for first place) all prize money is shared between the players. Players outside the brackets do not receive any prize money. All amounts are in United States dollars.

Open tournament:

Total: $350,000

Women's tournament:

Total: $150,000

Schedule 
The opening ceremony took place on Saturday 25 December. Start times are approximate as all matches in the previous round must finish before the next round can commence. All times are CET.

Tiebreak regulations 

For players who finish on the same score, final position is determined by the following tie-breaks, in order:

 Buchholz Cut 1 (the sum of the scores of each of the opponents of a player but reduced by the lowest score of the opponents)
 Buchholz (the sum of the scores of each of the opponents of a player)
 Average Rating of Opponents Cut 1 (average rating of opponents excluding the lowest rated opponent)
 The results of individual games between tied players
 Drawing of lots

If two or more players are tied for any position other than first, the above mentioned tiebreak system shall decide the ranking of the tied players.

If two or more players are tied for first, the top two players who finished the highest on the above mentioned tiebreaks shall play a two game mini match with the time control of 3+2 (with colours of the first game drawn) to decide the winner. If the score is tied 1-1, the players continue to play single 3+2 games until one of the players has won one game (the player who finished highest on the above mentioned tiebreaks shall have the white pieces for the first game and the colours will alternate from the next game).

Open tournament results 
The following table lists all participants, with the results from the 13 rounds. They are ranked according to the results, taking into account the tie-breaks.

Notation: "1 (W 116)" indicates a win (1 point) with white pieces (W) against player of rank 116 (Victor Mikhalevski)

Four players (defending world champion Magnus Carlsen, Nodirbek Abdusattorov, Ian Nepomniachtchi, and Fabiano Caruana) were tied for first after 13 rounds. Among these, the two players with the highest Buchholz Cut 1 score (Abdusattorov and Nepomniachtchi) played a title play-off in blitz time controls to decide the winner. Abdusattorov won the match 1.5 - 0.5 to become World Rapid Champion.

Women's tournament results 
The following table lists all participants, with the results from the 13 rounds. They are ranked according to the results, taking into account the tie-breaks.

Notation: "1 (B 83)" indicates a win (1 point) with black pieces (B) against player of rank 83 (Mihaela Sandu). The first tiebreak (labeled BC1) is the Buchholz Cut 1 score, the second tiebreak (labeled BS) is the Buchholz score, and the third tiebreak (labelled AROC1) is the average rating of opponents cut 1.

Notes

References 

World Rapid Chess Championship
2021 in chess
2021 in Polish sport
December 2021 sports events in Europe
Sports competitions in Warsaw
Chess in Poland